The name Jebi has been used to name four tropical cyclones in the northwestern Pacific Ocean. In addition, the variant Chebi was used in 2001 and 2006 before the spelling was corrected by the WMO Typhoon Committee. The name was submitted by South Korea and is a Korean word for the barn swallow (Hirundo rustica).

 Typhoon Chebi (2001) (T0102, 04W, Emong) – made landfall in the People's Republic of China.
 Typhoon Chebi (2006) (T0620, 23W, Queenie) – traversed the northern Philippines.
 Tropical Storm Jebi (2013) (T1309, 09W, Jolina) – struck the Philippines, mainland China and Vietnam.
 Typhoon Jebi (2018) (T1821, 25W, Maymay) – a strong Category 5 typhoon that made landfall in west Japan.

Pacific typhoon set index articles